Dražen Anzulović (born 7 May 1967) is a Croatian professional basketball coach and former player. He currently serves as a head coach for BC Enisey of the VTB United League.

Playing career
Anzulović spent most of his playing career in Cibona. He won the EuroLeague title as a player of Cibona in 1986 with Dražen Petrović on the team.

Coaching career
His head coaching career started after he got injured. As a head coach he has made great successes with Cibona, Cedevita, Spirou Charleroi and MKS Dąbrowa Górnicza. 

On 28 November 2017, he was appointed the head coach for Nanjing Monkey King. In April 2018, he left the Chinese club. 

On 19 June 2019, he was named the head coach for the VTB United League club BC Enisey.

National team coaching career
Anzulović has served as an assistant coach of the Croatia national team twice, the first time in period between 2006 and 2009, in which period Croatia qualified on the 2008 Summer Olympics held in Beijing, first time after 1992, and second time in the 2016 Summer Olympics held in Rio de Janeiro, where Croatia won the 5th place. 
 
On 24 April 2018, he was appointed the head coach for the senior Croatia national team, after Ivica Skelin parted ways with the HKS. On 2 May 2019, he was sacked and replaced by Veljko Mršić.

Career achievements and awards
As a player: 
FIBA European Champions Cup:
1985–86
As a coach:
Stanković Cup:
2018
Croatian Basketball Cup:
2011–12
Belgian Basketball Supercup:
2008–09
Belgian Basketball Cup:
2008–09
Pro Basketball League:
2008–09
2007–08
A-1 Liga Ožujsko:
2003–04
2005–06
2006–07

References

External links
 ABA League Coaching Profile
 EuroLeague profile

1967 births
Living people
BC Rytas coaches
Croatian basketball coaches
Croatian men's basketball players
KK Cibona players
KK Cibona coaches
KK Cedevita coaches
Point guards
Basketball players from Zagreb